CPSM may refer to:

 Canadian Peacekeeping Service Medal
 Certified Professional in Supply Management
 College of Physicians and Surgeons of Manitoba
 Stadionul CPSM, a football stadium in Vadul lui Vodă, Moldova